George B. Chalmers (October 19, 1908 – August 7, 1988) was an American football player. He played college football at NYU and professional football in the National Football League (NFL) as a back for the Brooklyn Dodgers. He appeared in seven NFL games during  the 1933 season.

References

1908 births
1988 deaths
NYU Violets football players
Brooklyn Dodgers (NFL) players
Players of American football from Massachusetts